Below is the list of 112 instances in which Major League Baseball players have hit 20 or more triples in a single season. Active players are in bold. However, with the retirement of Curtis Granderson in 2020, as of May 2020, none of the players on this list are currently active players in MLB.

See also related lists
List of Major League Baseball career triples leaders
List of Major League Baseball career doubles leaders
List of Major League Baseball career home run leaders
List of Major League Baseball career hits leaders
List of Major League Baseball career runs scored leaders
List of Major League Baseball career runs batted in leaders
20–20–20 club

Triples single-season
Major League Baseball statistics